Thoona is a town in north-eastern Victoria, Australia.

Thoona Post Office opened on 18 August 1882. Thoona Primary School closed in 2015.

The town itself is located on the edge of a small hill and the word Thoona is Aboriginal for “small hill”, also. Thoona was home to the first co-operative butter factory in north-east Victoria. In March each year Thoona hosts the Victorian Wheelie Bin championships. A documentary on the event was made in 2001.

References

External links

Thoona Primary School - Official website

Towns in Victoria (Australia)
Rural City of Benalla